The following is a list of Bowling Green Falcons men's basketball head coaches. The Falcons have had 18 coaches in their 107-season history.

Bowling Green's current head coach is Todd Simon. He was hired in March 2023 to replace Michael Huger, who was fired after the 2022–23 seasons.

References

Bowling Green

Bowling Green Falcons men's basketball coaches